Padayottam may refer to:
 Padayottam (1982 film), an Indian Malayalam-language epic period drama film
 Padayottam (2018 film),an Indian Malayalam-language black comedy film